Sir William Willatt Slack (22 February 1925 – 28 April 2019) was a surgeon who became dean of UCL Medical School and Serjeant Surgeon to Queen Elizabeth II.

References

1925 births
2019 deaths
Academics of University College London
Alumni of New College, Oxford
English surgeons
People educated at Winchester College